Rasor may refer to:

Rasor Off-Highway Vehicle Area, in the Mohave Desert, California
Rasor Airport, former name of Avoca Airport, a privately owned airport in Michigan
Rasor Elementary School, Plano, Texas

See also
Razor (disambiguation)
 Razer (disambiguation)
Razar (disambiguation)